Monroe County is a county on the eastern border of the U.S. state of Tennessee. As of the 2020 census, the population was 46,250. Its county seat is Madisonville.

History
During the early part of the 18th century, the area around what is now Monroe County was known as part of the traditional homelands of the Overhill Cherokee, a western subset of the Cherokee Nation. They had established towns and villages extending through much of the mountainous areas of western Virginia, the Carolinas, southeastern Tennessee, and portions of northeastern Georgia and Alabama. English colonists and European Americans tended to refer to these areas by geography: Lower Towns, along the upper Savannah River in South Carolina; Middle Towns in Western North Carolina west of the French Broad River; and the Overhill Towns, located generally along the west side of the Appalachian Mountains in present-day Tennessee, along the lower Little Tennessee River and upper Tennessee River; down into northeastern Georgia. Later the Cherokee expanded into western Georgia and what developed as Alabama.

The Overhill Towns had developed along the Little Tennessee and Tellico rivers throughout present-day Monroe County, Tennessee. These included Chota, Tanasi (the name source of "Tennessee"), and Great Tellico, which at various times were each considered the Cherokee principal town or "mother town". Also in this area were Citico, Toqua, Tomotley, Mialoquo, Chilhowee and Tallassee.

Archaeological excavations at the Citico site suggest the area was inhabited for thousands of years before the arrival of European settlers.  Artifacts uncovered from the Icehouse Bottom site near Vonore date to as early as 7500 B.C., during the Archaic period. Later prehistoric occupants were from indigenous cultures, such as the Woodland era and Southern Appalachia Mississippian culture, that preceded the rise of the historic Cherokee people. The latter group are believed to have migrated south from the Great Lakes area approximately in 1000 CE or later. 

They spoke an Iroquoian language, and most other Iroquoian tribes have historically occupied areas around the Great Lakes, including the powerful Five Nations of the Iroquois League, or Haudenosaunee, then based in present-day New York and Pennsylvania. The Tuscarora people of the Carolinas also spoke an Iroquoian language, and are believed to have come South. Following the disasters of the Yamasee War in the early 1700s, they decided to leave and migrated north, declaring the tribal migration complete in 1722 and settling near the Oneida people in western New York.

In 1756, during the French and Indian War (the North American front of the Seven Years' War), the British established Fort Loudoun on the Little Tennessee River near its confluence with the Tellico River, as part of an agreement with the Cherokee to gain support of their warriors. After relations soured between the British and Cherokee in 1760, when South Carolina authorities killed several Cherokee chiefs held prisoner in the colony, the Cherokee laid siege to Fort Loudoun. They killed two dozen of its garrison after their surrender in August 1760, and took many survivors captive for ransom. The British retaliated, attacking the Cherokee Lower Towns and Middle Towns in the Carolinas. 

Monroe County was established in 1819 after the signing of the Calhoun Treaty, in which the Cherokee ceded to the United States claims to lands stretching from the Little Tennessee River south to the Hiwassee River. The county was named for President James Monroe. The Cherokee migrated south and west deeper into Georgia and Alabama.

Some of the state's first gold mines were located in Monroe County. In the early 1830s, placer mining was conducted on Coker Creek (near Tellico Plains).

Monroe County was one of the few East Tennessee counties to support secession at the outbreak of the American Civil War; others in the area supported the Union.  On June 8, 1861, the county voted in favor of Tennessee's Ordinance of Secession by a margin of 1,096 to 774.

In the early 20th century, the Babcock Lumber Company conducted extensive logging operations in the Tellico Plains area. During the same period, the Aluminum Company of America began building a string of dams along the Little Tennessee, among them Calderwood, Santeetlah, and Cheoah, to harness water power for its aluminum smelting operations in nearby Alcoa.

After a construction program for flood control and generating hydroelectric power beginning in the 190s, the Tennessee Valley Authority planned construction in the 1960s of its last major project: Tellico Dam, completed in 1979. It was intended for flood control, the generation of hydroelectric power, and recreation related to creation of the manmade, large Tellico Reservoir. This water body flooded the lower 33 miles of the Little Tennessee River. Although the project had been opposed by many residents in the county, where several communities had to be abandoned and landowners relocated before the flooding, others supported the project. In the environmental analysis, the project was found to threaten an endangered species. The snail darter controversy delayed completion of the dam for some time.

Geography

The Unicoi Mountains, part of the greater Blue Ridge chain, dominate the southeastern part of the county.

The Little Tennessee River flows along Monroe County's border with Blount County to the northeast.  Three artificial lakes— Tellico Lake, Chilhowee Lake and Calderwood Lake— were developed in this section of the river.  The Tellico River, a tributary of the Little Tennessee, drains much of the southwestern part of the county.  The Bald River, noted for scenic Bald River Falls, is a tributary of the Tellico River. Sweetwater Creek, a tributary of the Tennessee River, drains a portion of northern Monroe County.

Adjacent counties
Loudon County (north)
Blount County (northeast)
Graham County, North Carolina (east)
Cherokee County, North Carolina (southeast)
Polk County (southwest)
McMinn County (west)

National protected areas
Bald River Gorge Wilderness
Cherohala Skyway (part)
Cherokee National Forest (part)
Citico Creek Wilderness

State protected areas
Fort Loudoun State Park
Tellico Blockhouse State Historic Site
Tellico Lake Wildlife Management Area (part)

Demographics

2020 census

As of the 2020 United States census, there were 46,250 people, 17,987 households, and 12,847 families residing in the county.

2010 census
As of the 2010 United States Census, there were 44,519 people and 20,581 housing units residing in the county. The population density was 70.00 persons per square mile and the housing unit density was 32.36 units per square mile. The racial makeup of the county was 95.23% White, 2.14% Black or African American, 0.48% Native American, 0.39% Asian, 0.02% Pacific Islander, and 1.48% from two or more races. Those of Hispanic or Latino origins were 3.30% of the population.

2000 census
As of the census of 2000, there were 38,961 people, 15,329 households, and 11,236 families residing in the county. The population density was 61 people per square mile (24/km2). There were 17,287 housing units at an average density of 27 per square mile (11/km2). The racial makeup of the county was 94.87% White, 2.27% Black or African American, 0.36% Native American, 0.36% Asian, 0.02% Pacific Islander, 0.86% from other races, and 1.26% from two or more races. 1.76% of the population were Hispanic or Latino of any race.

There were 15,329 households, out of which 32.10% had children under the age of 18 living with them, 59.40% were married couples living together, 10.00% had a female householder with no husband present, and 26.70% were non-families. 23.30% of all households were made up of individuals, and 9.40% had someone living alone who was 65 years of age or older. The average household size was 2.51 and the average family size was 2.94.

In the county, the population was spread out, with 24.70% under the age of 18, 8.70% from 18 to 24, 28.60% from 25 to 44, 24.80% from 45 to 64, and 13.20% who were 65 years of age or older. The median age was 37 years. For every 100 females there were 97.20 males. For every 100 females age 18 and over, there were 93.90 males.

The median income for a household in the county was $30,337, and the median income for a family was $34,902. Males had a median income of $29,621 versus $21,064 for females. The per capita income for the county was $14,951.  15.50% of the population and 12.00% of families were below the poverty line. Out of the total population, 19.40% of those under the age of 18 and 17.70% of those 65 and older were living below the poverty line.

Education
Monroe County Schools serves most of the county for all grades and the county for high school. Residents of Sweetwater are served by Sweetwater City Schools for elementary through junior high school.

Tennessee Meiji Gakuin High School was located in Sweetwater from 1989 to 2007.

Parks, forests, and natural features

A portion of the county is included in the Cherokee National Forest.  The Monroe section of the forest includes two federally designated wilderness areas— Citico Creek and Bald River Gorge.  The Joyce Kilmer Memorial Forest is located just across the North Carolina border to the east.  The Great Smoky Mountains National Park is located just across the Blount County border to the northeast.

The Cherohala Skyway, a national scenic byway, connects Tellico Plains with Robbinsville, North Carolina.  Crossing the Unicoi Mountains, the road peaks at an elevation of over 5,000 feet.

Fort Loudoun State Park is located on a peninsula near Vonore, and includes a replica of the 18th-century colonial Fort Loudoun.  The Tellico Blockhouse site lies across the river to the north from Fort Loudoun. The layout of the 1790s-era blockhouse is marked by stones and posts.  The Sequoyah Museum, dedicated to the Cherokee scholar who independently created a syllabary, a writing system for his language, is located near Fort Loudoun.

The Lost Sea is a commercially operated cave located 7 miles southeast of Sweetwater in Monroe County.  The lake was discovered by Ben Sands in 1905 when he was 13 years old. The underground lake for which it is named is the largest in North America.  Today the cave tour features a ride on the lake in boats with electric motors. In 1940, fossilized skeletons and footprints of two Pleistocene jaguars (Panthera onca augusta) were discovered in the cave.  They were excavated by George Gaylord Simpson of the American Museum of Natural History.

Transportation
U.S. Route 411 runs through the center of the county and through the cities of Madisonville and Vonore. U.S. Route 11 runs through the northwester part of the county and through the center of Sweetwater. State Route 68 runs in a northwest–southeast direction through the lower half of the county, passing through Sweetwater, Madisonville, and Tellico Plains. State Route 39 connects Tellico Plains to Englewood in McMinn County. State Route 72 connects southern Vonore to Loudon. Interstate 75 is located in the extreme northeastern tip of the county west of Sweetwater, and contains two exits in Monroe County. Secondary state routes in Monroe County include State Routes 165 (Cherohala Skyway), 307, 315, 322, and 360.

The Monroe County Airport is a county-owned, public-use airport located two nautical miles (3.7 km) northwest of the central business district of Madisonville.

Communities

Cities
Madisonville (county seat)
Sweetwater

Towns
Tellico Plains
Vonore (partial)

Census-designated places
Coker Creek
Kahite
Rarity Bay (partly in Loudon Co.)

Other unincorporated communities
Ballplay
Hopewell Mill
Hopewell Springs
Jalapa

Notable residents
 William Heiskell, post-Civil War Speaker of the Tennessee House of Representatives
 Sue K. Hicks, Scopes Trial attorney and later judge; believed to be the inspiration for the song, "A Boy Named Sue"
 Ray Jenkins, defense attorney and Senate counsel during the Army-McCarthy Hearings
 Estes Kefauver, U.S. senator
 Sharon Gail Lee, Tennessee Supreme Court justice
 Charles McClung McGhee, late 19th-century railroad tycoon
 Sequoyah, Cherokee scholar born in  Tuskegee Village (near Vonore); created the Cherokee syllabary, making reading and writing in Cherokee possible.
 John C. Vaughn, Confederate brigadier general; sheriff; California Gold Rush prospector
 Mary Ware (writer) (1828–1915), poet, prose writer
 Nancy Ward, Beloved Woman and political leader of the Cherokee, born in Chota

Politics

See also

National Register of Historic Places listings in Monroe County, Tennessee

References

External links

Monroe County, Tennessee (official site)
Monroe County, TNGenWeb - free genealogy resources for the county
TSLA Fact Sheet on Monroe County - Genealogical "Fact Sheets"

 
Counties of Appalachia
1819 establishments in Tennessee
Populated places established in 1819
Second Amendment sanctuaries in Tennessee
East Tennessee